Gleadall is a surname. Notable people with the surname include: 

Alfie Gleadall (born 2000), English cricketer
Eddie Gleadall (died 1993), English football player